Klara Semb (17 October 1884 – 16 October 1970) was a Norwegian folklorist, choreographer and folk dance educator. She was born in Kristiania; the daughter of Ole H. Semb and Amalie Jansen. She studied and documented old folk song traditions, and was leading folk dance courses of the organization Noregs Ungdomslag. She documented regional variations of traditional costumes, the bunad, and was a pioneer in bringing the bunad into a wider public. Among her books are the songbook Norske Folkeviser from 1920 and four volumes treating Norwegian folk dances. She published the children's book Danse, danse dokka mi in 1958. She was decorated Knight, First Class of the Order of St. Olav in 1954.

References

1884 births
1970 deaths
Writers from Oslo
Norwegian folklorists
Norwegian female dancers
Norwegian educators
Women folklorists